Angelo Picchetti (1591–1668) was a Roman Catholic prelate who served as Bishop of Nusco (1662–1668).

Biography
Angelo Picchetti was born in Monticelli, Italy in 1591.
On 16 January 1662, he was appointed during the papacy of Pope Alexander VII as Bishop of Nusco.
He served as Bishop of Nusco until his death on 28 September 1668.

References

External links and additional sources
 (for Chronology of Bishops) 
 (for Chronology of Bishops) 

17th-century Italian Roman Catholic bishops
Bishops appointed by Pope Alexander VII
1591 births
1668 deaths